Eberhard IV of Württemberg (23 August 1388, in Stuttgart – 2 July 1419, in Waiblingen) was the ruling Count of Württemberg from 1417 until his death.

Life
He was elder son of Count Eberhard III and Antonia Visconti. On 13 November 1397 he became engaged to Henriette of Mömpelgard. Henriette was the oldest daughter and main heiress of Henry of Mömpelgard, who died in 1396 one year before his father, Count Stephan of Mömpelgard. Their marriage, which occurred in 1407 at the latest, caused the county of Mömpelgard to become part of Württemberg. Eberhard IV also had a child with Agnes von Dagersheim, (Elisabeth von Dagersheim X Conrad Lyher).

Eberhard IV took active part in management of the state from 1407. Starting 1409 he governed the county of Mömpelgard together with Henriette. After the death of Eberhard III on 16 May 1417, he became the ruler of all of Württemberg. At the time of his death on 2 July 1419, Eberhard's two sons, Louis, who would later become Count Louis I, and Ulrich, later Count Ulrich V, were only seven and six years old, respectively. A guardianship government of Henriette and up to 32 Württembergian councilors was instituted.

Family and children
He was married to Henriette, Countess of Montbéliard and had two sons and a daughter:
 Anna of Württemberg (1408–1471), married Philip I, Count of Katzenelnbogen
 Louis I of Württemberg (1412 – 24 September 1450, Urach).
 Ulrich V of Württemberg (1413 – 1 September 1480, Leonberg).

Ancestors

References

This article is translated from that on the German Wikipedia

1388 births
1419 deaths
15th-century counts of Württemberg
Nobility from Stuttgart